Dante Julius Wesley (born April 5, 1979) is a former American football cornerback. He was drafted by the Carolina Panthers in the fourth round of the 2002 NFL Draft. He played college football at the University of Arkansas at Pine Bluff. Wesley was also a member of the Chicago Bears, New England Patriots and Detroit Lions.

Professional career

First stint with Carolina Panthers
Wesley was drafted by the Carolina Panthers in the fourth round (100th overall) of the 2002 NFL Draft.

Chicago Bears
In March 2006 he signed a 2-year contract with the Chicago Bears.

New England Patriots
After one season with the Bears, Wesley was acquired by the New England Patriots for an undisclosed draft pick in the 2008 NFL Draft.

Second stint with Panthers
On September 3, 2007, after being released by the Patriots, he signed again with the Panthers.

Wesley scored his first career touchdown on a 12-yard fumble return against the New Orleans Saints in the 2008 season finale.

In the 2009 NFL season, during a game against the Tampa Bay Buccaneers, Wesley hit the punt returner Clifton Smith, who had called for a fair catch but not yet received the ball. The Panthers were assessed a 15-yard penalty and he was ejected from the game. Two days later, the NFL suspended Wesley for one game without pay. Wesley said he never meant to harm Smith, saying he merely mistimed his hit on him and wanted to apologize to Smith.

Detroit Lions
Wesley signed with the Detroit Lions as an unrestricted free agent on April 3, 2010. Wesley was cut after the Lions had to go to the 53-man roster. He was re-signed by the Lions on September 30, 2010. He was released on October 19.

NFL statistics

References

1979 births
Living people
Players of American football from Arkansas
Sportspeople from Pine Bluff, Arkansas
American football cornerbacks
Arkansas–Pine Bluff Golden Lions football players
Carolina Panthers players
Chicago Bears players
Players of American football from St. Louis
Detroit Lions players